John Griffith Raybould (born 26 July 1934) is an English former first-class cricketer.

Raybould was born at Normanby in July 1934, and later attended New College, Oxford. While studying at Oxford he made his debut in first-class cricket for Oxford University against Yorkshire at Oxford in 1957. He made seventeen further appearances in first-class cricket for Oxford University across the 1958 and 1959 seasons. As a left-handed batsman he scored 263 runs, with a high score of 81 not out. With his leg break googly bowling, he took 30 wickets at an average of 37.13, with best figures of 4 for 31. He later made a first-class appearance for the Free Foresters against Oxford University in 1962, taking four wickets in the match.

References

External links

1939 births
Living people
Cricketers from Middlesbrough
Alumni of New College, Oxford
English cricketers
Oxford University cricketers
Free Foresters cricketers
English cricketers of 1946 to 1968